44 Squadron or 44th Squadron may refer to:

 No. 44 Squadron (Finland), a unit of the Finnish Air Force 
 44 Squadron SAAF, a unit of the South African Air Force
 No. 44 Squadron RAF, a unit of the United Kingdom Royal Air Force 
 44th Air Refueling Squadron (United States)
 44th Bombardment Squadron (United States)
 44th Fighter Squadron (United States)
 44th Observation Squadron (United States)
 44th Troop Carrier Squadron (United States)

See also
 44th Division (disambiguation)
 44th Brigade (disambiguation)